Ban Dan Lan Hoi is a district (amphoe) in the western part of Sukhothai province, in the lower north of Thailand.

History 
In the Sukhothai era, the district area was the western camp of patrolling soldiers. The village near the camp was called Ban Lan Khoi (บ้านลานคอย). The pronunciation changed with time to the present-day Ban Lan Hoi.

In the Rattanakosin era, the Interior Ministry created a new sub-district (tambon) named Ban Dan. It was upgraded to a minor district (king amphoe) under Mueang Sukhothai district in 1909. The district office was moved to Tambon Lan Hoi in 1916. When the Charot Withi Thong road, connecting Sukhothai with Tak was finished, they moved the office to Tambon Ban Dan again. In 1939 the district was renamed from Lan Hoi to Ban Dan Lan Hoi. In 1973 the government upgraded the minor district to a full district.

Geography 
Neighboring districts are (from the north clockwise) Thung Saliam, Si Samrong, Mueang Sukhothai, Khiri Mat  of Sukhothai Province, Phran Kratai of Kamphaeng Phet province, Mueang Tak, Ban Tak, of Tak Province and Thoen of Lampang province.

Administration 
The district is divided into seven sub-districts (tambons), which are further subdivided into 70 villages (mubans). The township (thesaban tambon) Lan Hoi covers parts of the tambon Lan Hoi. There are a further seven tambon administrative organizations (TAO).

References

External links
 Ban Dan Lan Hoi district history (Thai)

Ban Dan Lan Hoi